Earl W. Wallace (October 23, 1942 – May 12, 2018) was an American screen and television writer who began his career in the 1970s writing episodes of the hit CBS Western series Gunsmoke, one of which inspired him, his wife Pamela, and William Kelley to develop the screenplay for the 1985 film Witness.

Wallace's first submission to Gunsmoke came while he was city editor of a regional newspaper, the Thousand Oaks Acorn. He had enrolled in a screenwriting class where the assignments included the creation of an original episode of Gunsmoke. The professor submitted Wallace's teleplay to the Gunsmoke writing staff, who accepted it and ran it as an episode. They invited Wallace to submit further work and eventually offered him a regular position on their writing staff. When the show ended in its 20th season, Wallace was its head writer.

Wallace adapted the Herman Wouk novel War and Remembrance for a twelve-part miniseries broadcast by ABC. He also wrote episodes of How the West Was Won, Seven Brides for Seven Brothers, and Quinn Martin's Tales of the Unexpected, and several television movies, including Wild and Wooly, If These Walls Could Talk, A Murderous Affair: The Carolyn Warmus Story, and Rose Hill.

For his work on Witness, Wallace won the Academy Award for Best Original Screenplay, the Writers Guild of America Award for Best Original Screenplay, and the Edgar Award for Best Motion Picture Screenplay and was nominated for the Golden Globe Award for Best Screenplay and the BAFTA Award for Best Original Screenplay. He is the recipient of the Western Writers of America Spur Award for Best Television Script for How the West Was Won.

Wallace died in 2018.

References

External links
 

American male screenwriters
American television writers
Best Original Screenplay Academy Award winners
American male television writers
1942 births
2018 deaths